Pili station is a railway station located on the South Main Line in Camarines Sur, Philippines. It is still used for the Bicol Commuter.

History
Pili was opened on April 1, 1920 as part of the expansion of the Legazpi Division line from Tabaco, Albay to Nueva Caceras (Naga), through freight services to and from Manila commenced on January 11, 1938 and passenger services on January 31.

Philippine National Railways stations
Railway stations in Camarines Sur